Janusz Kozinski, is a higher education leader, researcher and entrepreneur, and expert in sustainable energy systems and immune building concepts applied to public safety and security.

He was the Founding President and Vice-Chancellor of the New Model Institute for Technology and Engineering in Hereford, UK, and the former Founding Dean of York University's Lassonde School of Engineering.

Education 
Following his graduation from the AGH University of Science and Technology in Kraków, Poland, in 1986 with a Ph.D. in Heat Engineering & Environmental Protection, Kozinski attended the Massachusetts Institute of Technology (MIT) and spent the majority of his academic career at McGill University, where he was a Sir William Dawson Scholar and Associate Vice-Principal of Research and International Relations.

Academia 
Kozinski served briefly as Founding President and Vice-Chancellor of the New Model Institute for Technology and Engineering (NMITE) in Hereford, for the period 2017-2018. Kozinski conceived an original academic program and imagined a master plan for total fundraising and investment of £500 million. NMITE was positioned as an ‘incubator of new ideas’, with a focus on graduating employment-ready, industry relevant, culturally intelligent, creative, ethically aware and financially literate young people. NMITE welcomed its first students in September 2021.

Prior to his position at Hereford, Kozinski served as Founding Dean of the Lassonde School of Engineering at York University. The $250 million initiative is home to the Renaissance Engineering™ program. Renaissance engineering is a curricular philosophy that includes interdisciplinary learning, industry collaboration and designing for positive social impact. Kozinski was also formerly Dean of the College of Engineering at University of Saskatchewan and Dean of the Faculty of Science and Engineering at York University.

Kozinski held the International Chair in Bioenergy at the Institute for Advanced Studies and the Centre National de la Recherche Scientifique and has completed the Advanced Management & Leadership Program at Oxford University and the Executive Education Program, Crisis Leadership in Higher Education, at Harvard University. Kozinski is a member of the Board of Canadian Mining Innovation Council.

Janusz Kozinski formerly wrote a column for the Huffington Post Canada before its closure.

Research 
Kozinski has led research teams and programs relating to energy, environmental, public health, and security issues

At Lassonde School of Engineering, Kozinski leads Energy Lab, which focuses on comprehensive research in the areas of energy generation, conversion, analysis, kinetics and management. Kozinski's research includes projects related to the next generation of nuclear reactors, the environmental impact of energy technology, greenhouse gas mitigation, fabrication of nanomaterials, public security in buildings vulnerable to bio-agents, and Mars exploration.

Selected works
Farooq, U., Kozinski, J. A., Khan, M. A., & Athar, M. (2010). Biosorption of heavy metal ions using wheat based biosorbents–a review of the recent literature. Bioresource Technology, 101(14), 5043-5053.
Fang, Z., Sato, T., Smith, R. L., Inomata, H., Arai, K., & Kozinski, J. A. (2008). Reaction chemistry and phase behavior of lignin in high-temperature and supercritical water. Bioresource Technology, 99(9), 3424-3430.
Farooq, U., Khan, M. A., Athar, M., & Kozinski, J. A. (2011). Effect of modification of environmentally friendly biosorbent wheat (Triticum aestivum) on the biosorptive removal of cadmium (II) ions from aqueous solution. Chemical Engineering Journal, 171(2), 400-410.
Koziński, J. A., & Saade, R. (1998). Effect of biomass burning on the formation of soot particles and heavy hydrocarbons. An experimental study. Fuel, 77(4), 225-237.

References

External links 
Janusz Kozinski on Google Scholar

Canadian businesspeople
Canadian people of Polish descent
Year of birth missing (living people)
Living people
20th-century births
Academic staff of York University